Aggabodhi II was King of Anuradhapura in the 7th century, whose reign lasted from 608 to 618.

During this period he progressed on work done by his uncle further. He constructed fourteen tanks including tanks Kantalai and Girithale.

During his reign time, the king of Kalinga came to Sri Lanka and became a monk due to fear of war. According to sources that should be due to invading of Chalukya king Pulakesin II (A.D.609-A.D.655) that happened in A.D.609.

After his throne was succeeded by his brother Sangha Tissa II.

See also
 List of Sri Lankan monarchs
 History of Sri Lanka
 Kantalai Tank

References

External links
 Kings & Rulers of Sri Lanka
 Codrington's Short History of Ceylon

Monarchs of Anuradhapura
A
A
A
A